Josep Pons (born Josep Pons i Viladomat; 1957) is a Spanish conductor.

Biography
Pons was born in Puig-reig, Berguedà.  He received his musical training at L'Escolania de Montserrat and continued his musical studies in Barcelona with such teachers as Josep Soler i Sardà (composition) and Antoni Ros-Marbà (conducting).

In 1985, Pons founded the Orquestra de Cambra Teatre Lliure (Chamber Orchestra of the Teatre Lliure).  He directed the Coral Càrmina from 1988 to 1990.  He was the musical director for the 1992 Summer Olympics.  Pons was the first artistic director of the Jove Orquestra Simfònica de Catalunya, later the Jove Orquestra Nacional de Catalunya, from 1993 to 2001.  He was principal conductor of the City of Granada Orchestra (Orquesta Ciudad de Granada) from 1994 to 2004.  In 2003, he became artistic director and principal conductor of the Spanish National Orchestra.  In October 2010, the Gran Teatre del Liceu announced the appointment of Pons as its next music director, as of September 2012, for an initial contract of 6 years.  In November 2017, the Liceu announced the extension of Pons' contract through the 2021-2022 season.  In July 2021, the Liceu announced a further extension of Pons' contract through the 2025-2026 season.

Pons has conducted commercial recordings for such labels as harmonia mundi. His honours include the City of Barcelona Award (1992) of the Cultural Institute of the City Council and the National Prize for Music (1999) granted by the Ministry of Culture.

References

External links
 HarrisonParrott agency page on Josep Pons
 José Manuel García Montes and Justino Losada Gómez, "Entrevista a Josep Pons" (Spanish-language interview).  Filomusica blog, October 2003
 Liceu biography of Josep Pons

1957 births
Living people
Spanish conductors (music)
Male conductors (music)
Conductors (music) from Catalonia
21st-century conductors (music)
21st-century male musicians
Spanish male musicians